Jeshrun Antwi-Boasiako (born October 4, 1997) is a professional Canadian football running back for the Montreal Alouettes of the Canadian Football League (CFL).

Early life 
Antwi was born in Israel, and moved to Ghana when he was five years old, where he primarily played soccer growing up. He moved to Calgary with his mother, Ama Kesewaa, when he was 12 years old and began playing gridiron football when he was 14 year old.

University career 
Antwi played U Sports football for the Calgary Dinos from 2015 to 2019. In 2016, he notably had 122 yards from scrimmage and two touchdowns in the Hardy Cup victory over the UBC Thunderbirds. He then played in his first Vanier Cup game in the 52nd Vanier Cup, where he had 25 carries for 177 yards, but the Dinos lost to the Laval Rouge et Or by a score of 31 to 26. In his fifth year with the team, the Dinos returned to the Vanier Cup, but Antwi did not play due to injury. The Dinos defeated the Montreal Carabins 27 to 13 in the 55th Vanier Cup as Antwi finished his university career as a national champion.

Professional career 
After becoming eligible for the 2019 CFL Draft, Antwi was drafted in the sixth round, 48th overall, by the Montreal Alouettes and signed with the team on May 6, 2019. He played in both preseason games with the team in 2019, but elected to return to school following training camp.

After completing his university playing eligibility, Antwi re-signed with the Alouettes on November 28, 2019. However, the 2020 CFL season was cancelled and he did not play in 2020. After making the team following training camp in 2021, he played in his first professional game on August 14, 2021, against the Edmonton Elks, where he had four carries for 13 yards. He played in all 14 regular season games where he had 36 rush attempts for 176 yards and six receptions for 46 yards. He had a career-high 13 carries for 69 yards in the regular season finale, but also had two costly fumbles as the Alouettes lost to the Ottawa Redblacks. He signed a two-year contract extension with the Alouettes on January 31, 2022.

In 2022, Antwi began the season as the backup running back, but was thrust into the starting role following an injury to William Stanback in the first game of the season. He started six of the next seven games where he had 48 carries for 255 yards and 11 catches for 78 yards before relinquishing the starting role to Tavien Feaster and then Walter Fletcher. Antwi finished the year as the team's leading rusher with 106 carries for 600 yards and also had 30 receptions for 200 yards.

References

External links 
Montreal Alouettes bio

1997 births
Living people
Canadian football running backs
Calgary Dinos football players
Ghanaian players of Canadian football
Montreal Alouettes players
Players of Canadian football from Alberta
Canadian football people from Calgary